The 2017 European Speed Skating Championships were held in Heerenveen, Netherlands, from 6 to 8 January 2017. Skaters from 12 countries participated. It was the first time that allround and sprint were held at the same time and venue.

The event was originally planned to be held in Zakopane, Poland, but in October 2016, the Polish skating union informed the ISU that it was not able to organize the event.

Sven Kramer of  Netherlands and Martina Sáblíková of the Czech Republic were the defending champions in allround. Kramer successfully defended his allround title, winning a record 9th title overall, and Ireen Wüst of the Netherlands won her 5th allround title. In sprint, Kai Verbij won the men's title, while Czech Karolína Erbanová won the women's event.

Schedule
The schedule of events:

All times are CET (UTC+1).

Allround

Men's championships 

DNS = did not start, WDR = withdrew, DQ = disqualified

Day 2

500 metres

5000 metres

Day 3

1500 metres

10,000 metres

Final ranking

Women's championships

Day 1

500 metres

3000 metres

Day 2

1500 metres

5000 metres

Final ranking

Sprint

Men's championships 
DNS = did not start, WDR = withdrew, DQ = disqualified

Day 1

500 metres

1000 metres

Day 2

500 metres

1000 metres

Final ranking

Women's championships

Day 2

500 metres

1000 metres

Day 3

500 metres

1000 metres

Final ranking

See also
 2017 World Allround Speed Skating Championships
 2017 World Sprint Speed Skating Championships

References 

2017 in Dutch sport
2017 in speed skating
2017 Allround
European Speed Skating Championships, 2017
January 2017 sports events in Europe
European, 2017